Mendig is a small town in the district Mayen-Koblenz, in Rhineland-Palatinate, Germany. It is situated approximately 6 km north-east of Mayen, and 25 km west of Koblenz. Mendig is the seat of the Verbandsgemeinde ("collective municipality") Mendig.

The popular rockfestival Rock am Ring was held in Mendig in 2015 and 2016.

Personalities 

 Rosemarie Nitribitt (1933-1957), spent her childhood in foster care in the Mendig Kaplan-slip road
 Andrea Nahles (born 1970), politician, Member of Bundestag (SPD) and a former Minister for Labour and Social Affairs, was born in Mendig

References

External links
Official website
Verbandsgemeinde Mendig

Mayen-Koblenz